Khadag Bahadur Malla (1853 - 1910) Pen name, Lal was a Bhojpuri writer, poet, author and journalist and the king of Majhauli Raj in Deoria Uttar Pradesh. He has written Maharasa play which is the dramatic version of Bhagavata Purana. His another notable work is Sudhabund, which is the collection of 60 Kajari songs and was published in 1884.

Life 
He was born in the ancient Vishwasen Dynasty in Majhauli Raj of Deoria in 1853. He was the king of Majhauli Raj and he wrote many Bhojpuri poems in his life time. He died in 1910.

Works 

 Bharat Aarat
Sudhabund
 Maharasa
 Bharat Lalna
 Kalpvrikshya
 Lal Bhaye Diwana Bakat Aan ke Aan

References 

People from Deoria district
Indian dramatists and playwrights
Writers from Uttar Pradesh
Journalists from Uttar Pradesh
Poets from Uttar Pradesh
1853 births
Year of death missing